English ministries
Political history of England
1690s in England
1690 establishments in England
1694 disestablishments in England
Government
Ministries of William and Mary